Lil' Wil (born Wil Martin, March 25, 1987) is an American rapper. In late 2007, he released the single "My Dougie", which charted on four Billboard singles charts. It was the lead-off single to his debut album Dolla$, TX, which was released in June 2008 by Asylum Records executive producer Pimp-n-Keys Ent and charted at #3 on Billboard's Top Heatseekers chart.

Discography

Studio albums
2008: Dolla$, TX

Official mixtapes
 2009: Dope Boi Fresh (with DJ Fletch) 
 2010: The Interview (with DJ Q) 
 2012: 100% Wil (with Definition DJ K Roc)

Singles

References

External links
  https://www.youtube.com/channel/UCENsq2Rm7zbKvVPnTU7i0Xw

1987 births
21st-century American rappers
21st-century American male musicians
African-American male rappers
Asylum Records artists
Living people
Rappers from Dallas
Rappers from New Orleans
Southern hip hop musicians
21st-century African-American musicians
20th-century African-American people